Oryol i Reshka (lit. Heads and Tails) is a Ukrainian travel TV show that launched in 2011. It is broadcast in the Russian language in Ukraine, Russia, Israel and Kazakhstan. Its reruns are also available on Polish and Israeli televisions.

Oryol i Reshka is hosted by two co-hosts. In each episode, the show visits another location in the world for one weekend. One of the hosts (determined by a coin toss) receives a credit card with unlimited credit (in practice, this has been limited to US$30,000 per day), called the Golden Card, while the other has to spend the weekend with US$100 including all expenses. Starting with the second season, the show has hidden a bottle with $100 in each visited location for travelers to find.

A spin-off, called Oryol i Reshka Shopping dealing with shopping, began airing on February 15, 2014.

Name
"Орел і Решка" or "Орёл и Решка" literally means "eagle and tails", referring to pre-revolutionary Russian coins with an eagle on the "heads" side.

Hosts

Oryol i Reshka

Oryol i Reshka: Shopping

Episode list

Season 1

Season 2

Season 3

Season 4

Season 5

Season 6

This season is titled Holiday season in this season, the show visited resort towns and locations, which had not been visited in the past.

Season 7
This season is titled Back to the USSR in this season the show traveled to locations in the Former Soviet Union. All countries were visited except Uzbekistan and Turkmenistan, where not all of the show's crew were able to obtain a visa or permission to film. Latvia was also skipped as it had been covered in a previous episode.

Season 8
In this season, titled On the Edge of the World, the show traveled to locations far away from Ukraine, especially in the far east and Australia and Oceania. Hosts – Kolya Serga and Regina Todorenko.

Season 9
In this season, titled Undiscovered Europe, the show traveled to locations in Europe that are not generally popular with Russian-speaking tourists.

Season 10
In this season, titled Anniversary, Part I, the format changed to include all previous hosts of the show, with each episode being hosted by a different couple.

Season 11
This season is titled Anniversary, Part II and continues the previous format.

Season 12
This season, titled Around the World, returned to the older format of permanent hosts.

Season 13
This season Paradise and Hell is so named because in it the program will visit paradise island and the most hellish places of the world, alternating between them.

Season 14
In this season, titled Reload, the hosts visited cities that had already been covered by the show.

Season 15
This season is titled Paradise and Hell 2 and continues the previous format, but now each city is divided into paradise and hell.

Stars 
This season is called Stars, a special season with the stars of show business.

Season 16 
This season is called Reload. America, and it continues previous format, but only in the Americas.

Season 17 
This season is called Marine Season, where the program goes to coastal locations and cities.

Over The Seas

Season 18 
This season is called Marine Season. Part 2, and it continues the previous format.

Season 19 
This season is called Reload. Part 3, and it continues previous format.

Season 20 
This season is called Marine Season. Part 3, and it continues the previous format.

Season 21 
This season is called Megapolises is about the largest cities of our planet.

Season 22 
This season is called Wonders of the World this season is about the most fantastic, ambitious and incredible on our planet.

Part 1

Part 2

Part 3

Part 4

Part 5

Season 23 
This season is called Ivleeva vs Bednyakov this season is about the competition of the two brightest stars of the project.

Season 24
That season is called Crazy weekends

Season 25
That season is called Girls

10 Years 
That season is called 10 Years

Season 26 
That season is called Earthlings

Season 27 
This season is called Earthlings. Part 2, and it continues the previous format.

Oryol i Reshka. Quarantine

Oryol i Reshka. In touch

Oryol i Reshka. Travel guide

Oryol i Reshka. Unreleased

Canceled episodes

Special episodes

Season 2 (2019)

Oryol i Reshka: Family 
Oryol i Reshka: Family or Oryol i Reshka: Semya is a project, that is being followed by Friday! channel. In this project, a family of four people (father + son, mother + daughter) goes to different locations, throw a coin and show how to travel with children.

Oryol i Reshka: Shopping

Episode list

Oryol i Reshka: Shopping. Unreleased

Notes

See also
Wish You Were Here...? - A British show with a similar format

References

External links
 Oryol i Reshka at the Inter channel 
 Unofficial map of visited locations

2011 Ukrainian television series debuts